Harry Lamb Barton (January 20, 1875 in Chester, Pennsylvania – January 25, 1955 in Upland, Pennsylvania) was an American baseball player who played catcher in the Major Leagues in 1905. He played for the Philadelphia Athletics.

References

External links

1875 births
1955 deaths
Major League Baseball catchers
Philadelphia Athletics players
Minor league baseball managers
Baseball players from Pennsylvania
Brockton Shoemakers players
Pawtucket Phenoms players
Williamsport Millionaires players
Providence Grays (minor league) players
Trenton Tigers players
Reading Pretzels players
Elmira Colonels players